Nuptown is a hamlet in Berkshire, England, and part of the civil parish of Warfield.

On some old maps it is called Upton Green.

Hamlets in Berkshire
Warfield